Bangka or Bangka Malay, is a Malayic language spoken in Indonesia, specifically on the Island of Bangka in the Bangka Belitung Islands of Sumatra. There are several dialects of Bangka Malay, including Mentok, Belinyu, Sungailiat, Koba, Toboali and Lom (Belom, Mapor). The Lom community has lived separately from mainstream Malay and is known for refusing Islam. Bangka Malay has a distinct vocabulary, grammar and phonology from other Malay languages.

References

Agglutinative languages
Languages of Indonesia
Malay dialects

Malayic languages